is a Japanese professional shogi player ranked 7-dan.

Early life
Yagura was born on September 27, 1974, in Osaka Prefecture. He entered the Japan Shogi Association's apprentice school at the rank of 6-kyū in 1986 under the guidance of shogi professional Kiyozumi Kiriyama, was promoted to the rank of 1-dan in 1990, and obtained full professional status and the rank of 4-dan in October 1994.

Playing style and theoretical contributions
Although his family name is the same as one of main strategies used in Static Rook openings, Yagura's speciality is Ranging Rook openings. He prefers to avoid established opening theory known as jōseki in favor of a more  games and is known for his piece maneuvering skill or sabaki. There is a variation of Central Rook named after him ( Yagura-ryū Nakabisha), which is not to be confused with the Central Rook variation of the Yagura opening.

Promotion history
The promotion history for Yagura is as follows.
 6-kyū: 1986
 1-dan: 1990
 4-dan: October 1, 1994
 5-dan: June 11, 1999
 6-dan: July 28, 2005
 7-dan: July 1, 2015

References

External links
ShogiHub: Professional Player Info · Yagura, Norihiro

Japanese shogi players
Living people
Professional shogi players
Professional shogi players from Osaka Prefecture
1974 births